Francis de Lorraine II, the first Prince of Joinville, also Duke of Guise and Duke of Aumale (17 February 1519 – 24 February 1563), was a French general and statesman. A prominent leader during the Italian War of 1551–1559 and French Wars of Religion, he was assassinated during the siege of Orleans in 1563.

Early life
Born in Bar-le-Duc (Lorraine), Guise was the son of Claude, Duke of Guise (created Duke of Guise in 1527), and his wife Antoinette de Bourbon. His sister, Mary of Guise, was the wife of James V of Scotland and mother of Mary, Queen of Scots. His younger brother was Charles, Cardinal of Lorraine. He was the youthful cousin of Henry II of France, with whom he was raised, and by birth a prominent individual in France, though his detractors emphasised his "foreign" origin (he was a prince étranger), namely the Duchy of Lorraine.

In 1545, he was seriously wounded at the Second Siege of Boulogne, but recovered. He was struck with a lance through the bars of his helmet. He sat firm in his saddle, and rode back unassisted to his tent; and when the surgeon thought he would die of pain, when the iron was extracted, 'he bore it as easily as if it had been but the plucking of a hair out of his head.' The scar would earn him the nickname "Le Balafré" ("The Scarred One").

In 1548 he was magnificently wedded to Anna d'Este, daughter of the Duke of Ferrara, Ercole II d'Este, and French princess, Renée, the daughter of Louis XII.

Military career

In 1551, he was created Grand Chamberlain of France. He won international renown in 1552 when he successfully defended the city of Metz from the forces of Charles V, Holy Roman Emperor, and defeated the imperial troops again at the Battle of Renty in 1554. but the Truce of Vaucelles temporarily curtailed his military activity.

He led an army into Italy in 1557 to aid Pope Paul IV, his army in conjunction with that of Brissac capturing Valenza. There they parted ways and Guise continued along the Po Valley with 16,000 men. Instructed to take Parma, he assessed it as unviable, proposing instead attacking Florence to secure lines south. the duke of Tuscany fearing such a possibility diplomatically reached out to Henri II and Guise was informed of the negotiations. Advancing into Naples in April, his troops became restless from lack of pay. Hearing reports Alba was marching along the Adriatic coast with an army of 18,000 aiming to cut his supply, Guise sought battle, but Alba was evasive. Guise was now instructed by Henri to break off his Naples campaign and return to campaign in Lombardy before this in turn was superseded by news of the disastrous defeat of the Constable de Montmorency at the Battle of St. Quentin. 

Guise was recalled to France, and hurriedly made Lieutenant-General. Taking the field, he captured Calais from the English on 7 January 1558— an enormous propaganda victory for France— then Thionville and Arlon that summer, and was preparing to advance into Luxembourg when the Peace of Cateau-Cambrésis was signed. Throughout the reign of Henry II Guise was one of the premier military figures of France, courteous, affable and frank, and largely popular, the "grand duc de Guise" as his contemporary Brantôme called him.

The accession of Francis's niece Mary, Queen of Scots, and her husband, Francis II of France (10 July 1559), however, was a triumph for the Guise family, and the Grand Master of France Montmorency conscious there was no place for him in the new order, withdrew from court. The Duke of Guise and his brother, Charles, Cardinal of Lorraine were supreme in the royal council. Occasionally he signed public acts in the royal manner, with his baptismal name only.

The Wars of Religion

In reaction to the dominating power at court of the ultra-Catholic Guises, La Renaudie, a Protestant gentleman of Périgord, perhaps at the distanced instigation of Louis of Bourbon, Prince of Condé, organized a plot, the conspiracy of Amboise, to seize the person of the Duke of Guise and his brother Charles, the Cardinal of Lorraine. When the ill-organized plot was put off for six days, it was discovered by the court well ahead of time. On 12 March 1560, the Huguenots stormed the Château d'Amboise, to which the Guises had moved the young king and queen for safety. The uprising was violently suppressed, with 1,200 executed, many within sight of the castle. In the immediate aftermath Condé was obliged to flee the court, and the power of the Guises was supreme. The discourse which Coligny, leader of the Huguenots, pronounced against les Guises in the Assembly of Notables at Fontainebleau (August, 1560), did not influence King Francis II in the least, but resulted rather in the imprisonment of Condé, at Charles's behest.

However, the king died on 5 December 1560—making Mary, Queen of Scots a widow, and of little political importance. The Guises lost status alongside her, thus making a year full of calamity for the Guises both in Scotland and France. Within a year and a half, their influence waxed great and waned. After the accession of Charles IX, the Duke of Guise lived in retirement on his estates. 

The regent, Catherine de' Medici, was at first inclined to favour the Protestants.  To defend the Catholic cause, the Duke of Guise, together with his old enemy, the Constable de Montmorency and the Maréchal de Saint-André formed the so-called triumvirate opposed to the policy of concessions which Catherine de' Medici attempted to inaugurate in favour of the Protestants. His former military hero's public image was changing: "he could not serve for long as the military executive of this extreme political, ultra-montane, pro-Spanish junta without attracting his share of odium," N. M. Sutherland has observed in describing the lead-up to his assassination.

The plan of the Triumvirate was to treat with Habsburg Spain and the Holy See, and also to come to an understanding with the Lutheran princes of Germany to induce them to abandon the idea of relieving the French Protestants. About July, 1561, Guise wrote to this effect to the Duke of Württemberg. The Colloquy at Poissy (September and October 1561) between theologians of the two confessions was fruitless, and the conciliation policy of Catherine de' Medici was defeated. From 15 to 18 February 1562, Guise visited the Duke of Württemberg at Saverne, and convinced him that if the conference at Poissy had failed, the fault was that of the Calvinists.

As Guise passed through Wassy-sur-Blaise on his way to Paris (1 March 1562), a massacre of Protestants took place. It is not known to what extent he was responsible for this, but the Massacre of Vassy kindled open military conflict in the French Wars of Religion. The siege of Bourges in September was the opening episode, then Rouen was retaken from the Protestants by Guise after a month's siege (October); the Battle of Dreux (19 December), at which Montmorency was taken prisoner and Saint-André slain, was in the end turned by Guise to the advantage of the Catholic cause, and Condé, leader of the Huguenots, was taken prisoner.

Assassination

In the fourth encounter, Guise was about to take Orléans from the Huguenot supporters of Condé when he was wounded on 18 February 1563 by the Huguenot assassin, Jean de Poltrot de Méré, and died six days later, bled to death by his surgeons, at Château Corney.

It was not the first plot against his life. A hunting accident—Francis had been appointed Grand Veneur of France in 1556—had been planned, as Sir Nicholas Throckmorton informed Queen Elizabeth I of England in May 1560, but the plot was divulged by one of the conspirators who lost their nerve and his five co-conspirators fled.

Guise's unexpected death temporarily interrupted open hostilities. In his testimony, Poltrot implicated Coligny and the Protestant pastor Théodore de Bèze. Though the assassin later retracted his statement and Coligny denied responsibility for Guise's death, a bitter feud arose between Guise's son Henry and Coligny, which culminated in the St Bartholomew's Day massacre.

Family
Guise married Anna d'Este, daughter of Ercole II d'Este, Duke of Ferrara, and Renée of France, in Saint-Germain-en-Laye on 29 April 1548. They had seven children:
 Henry I, Duke of Guise (1550–1588), who succeeded him as Duke of Guise.
 Catherine (18 July 1551, Joinville – 6 May 1596, Paris), married on 4 February 1570 Louis, Duke of Montpensier
 Charles, Duke of Mayenne (1554–1611)
 Louis II, Cardinal of Guise (1555–1588), Archbishop of Reims
 Antoine (25 April 1557 – 16 January 1560)
 François (31 December 1559, Blois – 24 October 1573, Reims)
 Maximilien (25 October 1562–1567)

Ancestry

See also
House of Guise

Notes

References

Sources

 online.
  Presentation online. Review in Cahiers de Recherches Médiévales et Humanistes. Review in Revue d’histoire moderne & contemporaine.

1519 births
1563 deaths
People from Bar-le-Duc
French generals
Military leaders of the Italian Wars
Deaths by firearm in France
French people of the French Wars of Religion
French Roman Catholics
Dukes of Aumale
102
Guise, Francis Joseph of
Grand Masters of France
Grand Chamberlains of France
Ancien Régime office-holders
16th-century French people
Grand Huntsmen of France
Francis
Francis
Assassinated French politicians
Court of Henry II of France
Court of Charles IX of France
Court of Francis II of France